Adel Bader (Arabic:عادل بدر) (born 17 January 1997) is a Qatari footballer. He currently plays for Al-Sailiya.

External links
 

Qatari footballers
1996 births
Living people
Lekhwiya SC players
Al Kharaitiyat SC players
Al-Duhail SC players
Al-Khor SC players
Al-Sailiya SC players
Qatar Stars League players
Association football midfielders
Place of birth missing (living people)